Dennyloanhead railway station served the village of Longcroft, Falkirk, Scotland from 1888 to 1935 on the Kilsyth and Bonnybridge Railway.

History 
The station opened 2 July 1888 by the Kilsyth and Bonnybridge Railway. The goods yard was on the east side as well as sidings that served Knowehead Colliery to the north. The station closed 1 February 1935.

References

External links 

Disused railway stations in Falkirk (council area)
Railway stations in Great Britain opened in 1888
Railway stations in Great Britain closed in 1935
1888 establishments in Scotland
1935 disestablishments in Scotland